Sevirumab (MSL-109) is a human monoclonal antibody for the treatment of infections with cytomegalovirus in patients with AIDS.

References 

Monoclonal antibodies
Experimental drugs